Woodlawn Park is a home rule-class city in Jefferson County, Kentucky, United States. The population was 942 at the 2010 census, down from 1,033 at the 2000 census.

History
Woodlawn Park lies on the site of the former Woodlawn Race Course, which opened in 1859 and drew national attention. The course closed after the Civil War. R. A. Alexander, noted breeder, was a major figure in buying estate for the National Racing Association. He contracted with Tiffany's to design the Woodlawn Vase, used in 1861 and 1862. It was buried for safety during the war. The vase is now the winner's trophy at the Preakness Stakes, where a replica is given each year.

Woodlawn Park was incorporated March 10, 1955.

Geography
Woodlawn Park is located in northeastern Jefferson County at  (38.261446, -85.632950). It is bordered to the north by Windy Hills, to the west by St. Matthews, to the south by Beechwood Village, and to the east by consolidated Louisville/Jefferson County.

Interstate 264 runs just east of the community.

Demographics

As of the census of 2000, there were 1,033 people, 428 households, and 312 families residing in the city. The racial makeup of the city was 97.58% White, 0.97% African American, 0.77% Asian, and 0.68% from two or more races. Hispanic or Latino of any race were 0.68% of the population.

There were 428 households, out of which 29.7% had children under the age of 18 living with them, 60.7% were married couples living together, 10.3% had a female householder with no husband present, and 27.1% were non-families. 25.0% of all households were made up of individuals, and 11.0% had someone living alone who was 65 years of age or older. The average household size was 2.41 and the average family size was 2.89.

In the city, the population was spread out, with 22.0% under the age of 18, 4.3% from 18 to 24, 31.6% from 25 to 44, 24.1% from 45 to 64, and 18.1% who were 65 years of age or older. The median age was 40 years. For every 100 females, there were 94.2 males. For every 100 females age 18 and over, there were 88.8 males.

The median income for a household in the city was $55,000, and the median income for a family was $61,016. Males had a median income of $45,357 versus $33,365 for females. The per capita income for the city was $27,446. About 1.3% of families and 1.6% of the population were below the poverty line, including none of those under age 18 and 1.1% of those age 65 or over.

References

External links
 City of Woodlawn Park official website

Cities in Jefferson County, Kentucky
Cities in Kentucky
Louisville metropolitan area